Tetraethylammonium cyanide is the organic compound with the formula (C2H5)4NCN.  It is a "quat salt" of cyanide.  It is a colorless, deliquescent solid that is soluble in polar organic media.  It is used in the synthesis of cyanometallates.

Tetraethylammonium cyanide is prepared by ion exchange from tetraethylammonium bromide. The corresponding tetraphenylarsonium salt is prepared similarly.

Safety
The salt is highly toxic.

See also
 Tetraethylammonium
 Tetramethylammonium chloride

References

Tetraethylammonium salts
Cyanides